A dark stain is often associated with fossils of the Burgess Shale, representing decay fluids that were squashed out of the organism during the taphonomic process.

Occurrence
It is most famously known in (and most commonly associated with) Marrella, and is also known in other organisms: for example, Aysheaia, where it protrudes from the anterior (and in one case posterior) end of the animal; Hallucigenia, Naraoia, and Alalcomeneaus. It is also present in other Lagerstätten, for example in Carboniferous crustacea from Ireland.

Formation
The formation of this stain is the subject of ongoing research.   It was originally speculated that it represented body contents forced out by the pressure of overlying rocks, although decay contents would form more quickly and thus be a more likely interpretation.  This is supported by their presence around organisms whose external wall apparently ruptured; dark stains are also found in Carboniferous fish, and oily liquids have been seen to ooze out of the mouths and anuses of decaying seals. A high abundance of elemental copper has been taken to suggest that it represents "blood" (i.e. the hemolymph of arthropods and molluscs). Although copper was not analyzed in the canonical work on Elemental Mapping of Burgess Shale organisms, the dark stain was higher in silicon and lower in aluminum and potassium than elsewhere.

References

Burgess Shale